Billboard Top Hits: 1984 is a compilation album released by Rhino Records in 1992, featuring ten hit recordings from 1984.

The track lineup includes seven songs that reached the top of the Billboard Hot 100 chart, with the remaining three songs each reaching the top five of the chart.

Critical reception
Heather Phares of AllMusic cited the album as "one of the decade's strongest collections of singles." Robert Christgau of The Village Voice gave the album an A rating and wrote: "After four Brits and Eddy Grant in two years, we get five black artists, five U.K. artists, and 'Talking in Your Sleep.' It didn't mean much—this was also the year of Reagan rampant, with 'Karma Chameleon' the only vaguely progressive moment. But give two cheers for formal evolution, the mass marketplace, the pleasures of false consciousness, and England swinging like a pendulum do."

Track listing

Track information and credits were taken from the album's liner notes.

References

1992 compilation albums
Billboard Top Hits albums